Donald W. Fairfield (born October 18, 1929) is an American professional golfer who played on the PGA Tour and the Senior PGA Tour.

Fairfield was born in Kansas, but grew up in Jacksonville, Illinois. He served in the U.S. Air Force.

Fairfield played full-time on the PGA Tour between 1956 and 1963, and won three times. He was head professional at Casey Country Club in Casey, Illinois from 1954 to 1955; and at Eldorado Country Club in Indian Wells, California from 1964 to 1997. His best finish in a major championship was a loss in the quarterfinals (T-5) at the 1955 PGA Championship.

Fairfield played sparingly on the Senior PGA Tour from 1980 to 1989. His best result was in his first event, a T-16 at the Atlantic City Senior International in 1980.

Fairfield and his wife, Iris, have two sons, Jim and Jeff; both are golf professionals.

Professional wins (3)

PGA Tour wins (3)

PGA Tour playoff record (0–1)

References

External links

American male golfers
PGA Tour golfers
PGA Tour Champions golfers
Golfers from Kansas
Golfers from Illinois
Sportspeople from Jacksonville, Illinois
People from Indian Wells, California
1929 births
Living people